Richard Andrew Dryden (born 14 June 1969) is an English former professional footballer turned manager and coach.

Playing career
Born in Stroud, Gloucestershire, Dryden started his career as a trainee with Bristol Rovers, joining them as a professional on 14 July 1987. He then joined Exeter City on loan on 22 September 1988 before signing permanently on 8 March 1989 for a fee of £10,000, where he first played under manager Terry Cooper. During Dryden's time at Exeter, he made a total of 92 appearances and also spent time on loan with Manchester City. While at Exeter, he played a major part in their 1989–90 Fourth Division title triumph. Notts County was the next stop for Dryden, joining on 9 August 1991 for a fee of £250,000. He moved on to Birmingham City for £165,000 on 19 March 1993, where he was re-united with Terry Cooper. After Birmingham, Dryden moved on 16 December 1994 to Bristol City for a fee of £140,000, the rivals of his first club, Bristol Rovers.

On the recommendation of Terry Cooper, now Southampton's chief scout, Dryden moved to Southampton on 6 August 1996 for £150,000. He made his debut on 18 August 1996 at home to Chelsea and successfully marked Gianluca Vialli out of the game in a 0–0 draw. Although he featured regularly in the first team under manager Graeme Souness in 1996–97 (making 29 league appearances), the remainder of his time at The Dell was difficult as Southampton had 5 managers during the course of his 5 seasons with the club. He played a total of 54 games for the FA Premier League side, scoring 4 goals in all competitions. Three of these goals came in Southampton's run in the 1996–97 League Cup. This included a goal against Peterborough United and two against Oxford United; one in the original tie and another in the replay. His only other goal for Southampton came against Nottingham Forest in the league.

He was also loaned out to Stoke City, Northampton Town and Swindon Town while at Southampton. Whilst at Stoke he played as a substitute as they won the 2000 Football League Trophy Final. He signed on loan for Swindon on 24 November 2000. Dryden's spell at the club hardly started well – he was credited with an own goal on his debut, during a 3–0 loss at home against Stoke City on 25 November. This was followed by two consecutive victories against Northampton Town and Rotherham United, but his final four appearances for Swindon all ended in defeat.

On 2 February 2001, Dryden joined Luton Town on a permanent contract. He moved on to Scarborough on 11 July 2002 after playing for the club on loan in the 2001–02 season.

May 2003 saw him join Worksop Town for a brief spell before moving to Tamworth.

Managerial and coaching career
Dryden was appointed assistant manager of Tamworth when Mark Cooper took charge of the club in April 2004. On 24 January 2007, Dryden's contract with Tamworth was terminated by mutual consent, at the same time as Cooper's contract.

In March 2007, Dryden signed for Shepshed Dynamo. In November 2007, he became manager of Conference North club Worcester City but left this post after being sacked on 17 January 2010. He was subsequently appointed assistant manager at Darlington, but was dismissed together with Mark Cooper on 14 October 2011.

Dryden was appointed as York City's head of youth team coaching in July 2012, working alongside youth team coach Steve Torpey. He left in December 2014 after a reorganisation of the club's youth coaching structure.

In October 2015, he was officially confirmed as the new under 21s manager at Notts County. Following the departure of Ricardo Moniz as manager in January 2016, he was appointed caretaker manager of the first team. Following Mark Cooper's appointment as Notts County manager in March 2016, he became a part of Cooper's backroom team in the first team set-up once again.

In June 2016, he joined Indian club East Bengal as assistant coach. In May 2021, Dryden followed Mark Cooper again to be his assistant at Barrow. On 20 March 2022, Dryden left the club following the mutual termination of Cooper's contract.

Career statistics
Source:

References

External links

1969 births
Living people
People from Stroud
Sportspeople from Gloucestershire
English footballers
Association football defenders
Bristol Rovers F.C. players
Exeter City F.C. players
Manchester City F.C. players
Notts County F.C. players
Plymouth Argyle F.C. players
Birmingham City F.C. players
Bristol City F.C. players
Southampton F.C. players
Stoke City F.C. players
Northampton Town F.C. players
Swindon Town F.C. players
Luton Town F.C. players
Scarborough F.C. players
Worksop Town F.C. players
Tamworth F.C. players
Shepshed Dynamo F.C. players
Premier League players
English Football League players
National League (English football) players
English football managers
Worcester City F.C. managers
Notts County F.C. managers
National League (English football) managers
English Football League managers
Tamworth F.C. non-playing staff
York City F.C. non-playing staff
Forest Green Rovers F.C. non-playing staff
Bury F.C. non-playing staff
Leyton Orient F.C. non-playing staff
Barrow A.F.C. non-playing staff
Association football coaches